Francis Peabody may refer to:
 Francis Peabody, founder of Chatham, New Brunswick
 Francis Greenwood Peabody (1847–1936), minister and professor of theology at Harvard University
 Francis H. Peabody, co-founder of Kidder, Peabody & Co.
 Francis S. Peabody (1858–1922), American businessman who founded Peabody Coal
 Francis Weld Peabody (1881–1927), American physician
 Francis Peabody Jr. (1854–1938), American lawyer, sportsman, businessman and political figure